Palmovka is a Prague Metro station on Line B and also a neighborhood and a street in Libeň (Prague 8). The western metro entrance connects the station with the tram lines; the eastern one connects the station to a bus terminal.

The station was opened on 22 November 1990 as part of the extension from Florenc to Českomoravská. The station was dug by a cut-and-cover method. Both ends of the platform have escalators connecting users with the vestibules. Step-free access for the station was completed in November 2017, through the installation of two passenger lifts connecting the western metro station entrance with the station platform.

The name of the station and adjacent neighbourhood derives from the Palm's homestead, from the family name of the 18th-century owners of the homestead, which have already disappeared under the new development.

Gallery

References

Prague Metro stations
Railway stations opened in 1990
1990 establishments in Czechoslovakia
Railway stations in the Czech Republic opened in the 20th century